Invisible Girl is the third studio album by garage rock band The King Khan & BBQ Show. The album was recorded in 2008 and was released on November 3, 2009.

Track listing

References

External links
 Mark Sultan's website

2009 albums
The King Khan & BBQ Show albums
In the Red Records albums